The enzyme glycerophosphocholine phosphodiesterase (EC 3.1.4.2) catalyzes the reaction

sn-glycero-3-phosphocholine + H2O  choline + sn-glycerol 3-phosphate

This enzyme belongs to the family of hydrolases, specifically those acting on phosphoric diester bonds.  The systematic name is sn-glycero-3-phosphocholine glycerophosphohydrolase. Other names in common use include glycerophosphinicocholine diesterase, glycerylphosphorylcholinediesterase, ''sn''-glycero-3-phosphorylcholine diesterase, glycerolphosphorylcholine phosphodiesterase, and glycerophosphohydrolase.  This enzyme participates in glycerophospholipid metabolism.

References

 
 
 

EC 3.1.4
Enzymes of unknown structure